Ambrosio Echemendia (born 1843) was an Afro-Cuban slave and poet. He authored poems such as Al Damují and Un incrédulo de mis versos. Accused of being involved in slave rebellions on the island, Cuba's white literary elite were so impressed by his verses that they raised $1000 to set him free in 1865.

References

19th-century Cuban poets
Cuban male poets
Cuban slaves
1843 births
Year of death unknown
19th-century male writers